The Kakhovka Reservoir (Kakhovs′ke vodoskhovyshche) is a water reservoir on the Dnieper River in Ukraine. It was created in 1956, when the Kakhovka Hydroelectric Power Plant was built. It is one of several reservoirs in the Dnieper reservoir cascade.

Geography
The reservoir covers a total area of 2,155 square kilometres in the Kherson, Zaporizhzhia, and Dnipropetrovsk Oblasts of Ukraine. It is 240 km long and up to 23 km wide. The depth varies from 3 to 26 metres and averages 8.4 meters. The total water volume is 18.2 km³.

It is used mainly to supply hydroelectric stations, the Krasnoznamianka Irrigation System, the Kakhovka Irrigation System, industrial plants such as the 5.7 GW Zaporizhzhia Nuclear Power Plant, freshwater fish farms, the North Crimean Canal and the Dnieper–Kryvyi Rih Canal. Its creation formed a deep-water route for ships to sail up the Dnieper.

2022 Russian invasion of Ukraine
Since early November 2022, the spillways at the Kakhovka Hydroelectric Power Plant have been opened, and the reservoir has dropped to its lowest level in 3 decades, putting irrigation and drinking water resources at risk, as well as the coolant systems for the Zaporizhzhia Nuclear Power Plant. Between December 1st, 2022 and February 6th, 2023 the water level has dropped 2 meters.

Gallery

See also
 List of reservoirs by volume
 Energy in Ukraine
 Renewable energy in Ukraine

References

External links  

 
Reservoirs in Ukraine
Geography of Dnipropetrovsk Oblast
Geography of Zaporizhzhia Oblast
Geography of Kherson Oblast
Reservoirs built in the Soviet Union
1956 establishments in the Soviet Union
1956 establishments in Ukraine
Infrastructure completed in 1956
Reservoirs of the Dnieper